The Sumqayit trolleybus system was a system of trolleybuses forming part of the public transport service in Sumqayit (alternatively transliterated as Sumgait), the third most populous city in Azerbaijan, for most of the second half of the 20th century.

History
The system was opened on 28 April 1961. At its height, it consisted of eight lines.  The only remaining line was closed on 31 December 2005 (i.e., with effect from 1 January 2006).

Services
The line operating immediately before closure of the system was:

6. Торговый центр (Shopping Centre) - Микрорайоны (Neighbourhoods)

Fleet
The Sumqayit trolleybus fleet in the period leading up to the system's closure was made up of 13 vehicles of type ZiU-9.

Previously, the system had used trolleybus vehicles of the following types:

MTB-82
Škoda 9Tr
ZiU-5

See also

History of Sumqayit
List of trolleybus systems
Trolleybuses in former Soviet Union countries

References

External links

 
 

Sumqayit
Transport in Sumgait
Sumqayit